Events in the year 1952 in Egypt.

Events
 27 January, Aly Maher Pasha became the Prime Minister of Egypt for the 3rd time. 
 2 March, Aly Maher Pasha resigned.

Births 
 
 16 January, Fuad II of Egypt, The last King of Egypt and the Sudan from July 1952 to June 1953
 4 March, Saad El-Katatni, The first Speaker of the People's Assembly after the Egyptian Revolution of 2011.
 8 July, Ahmed Nazif, Prime Minister of Egypt from 14 July 2004 to 29 January 2011. 
 15 August, Ahmed Zulfikar, Mechanical Engineer and Entrepreneur. 
 20 August, Youssef Boutros Ghali,  Minister of Finance from 2004 to 2011.
 20 October, Sameh Shoukry,   Minister of Foreign Affairs of Egypt since 2014.
 4 November, Pope Tawadros II of Alexandria, the 118th and current pope of Alexandria and patriarch of the See of St. Mark.

Deaths 
 5 August, Sameera Moussa,  the first female Egyptian nuclear physicist.

References

 
Years of the 20th century in Egypt
Egypt
Egypt